As of September 2021, the International Union for Conservation of Nature (IUCN) lists 1085 endangered amphibian species. Of all evaluated amphibian species, 14% are listed as endangered. 
No subpopulations of amphibians have been evaluated by the IUCN.

For a species to be considered endangered by the IUCN it must meet certain quantitative criteria which are designed to classify taxa facing "a very high risk of extinction". An even higher risk is faced by critically endangered species, which meet the quantitative criteria for endangered species. Critically endangered amphibians are listed separately. There are 1393 amphibian species which are endangered or critically endangered.

Additionally 1193 amphibian species (16% of those evaluated) are listed as data deficient, meaning there is insufficient information for a full assessment of conservation status. As these species typically have small distributions and/or populations, they are intrinsically likely to be threatened, according to the IUCN. While the category of data deficient indicates that no assessment of extinction risk has been made for the taxa, the IUCN notes that it may be appropriate to give them "the same degree of attention as threatened taxa, at least until their status can be assessed".

This is a complete list of endangered amphibian species evaluated by the IUCN.

Salamanders
There are 161 salamander species assessed as endangered.

Lungless salamanders
{{columns-list|colwidth=30em|*Inyo Mountains salamander (Batrachoseps campi)
Coal black salamander (Bolitoglossa anthracina)
Cerro Pando salamander (Bolitoglossa compacta)
Bolitoglossa copinhorum
Oak forest salamander (Bolitoglossa cuchumatana)
Camp Sasardi salamander (Bolitoglossa cuna)
Bolitoglossa daryorum
Bolitoglossa diaphora
Dunn's climbing salamander (Bolitoglossa dunni)
Engelhardt's climbing salamander (Bolitoglossa engelhardti)
Bolitoglossa eremia
Yellow-legged mushroomtongue salamander (Bolitoglossa flavimembris)
Yellowbelly mushroomtongue salamander (Bolitoglossa flaviventris)
Gomez's web-footed salamander (Bolitoglossa gomezi)
Guaramacal's salamander (Bolitoglossa guaramacalensis)
Holy-mountain salamander (Bolitoglossa heiroreias)
Paramo Frontino salamander (Bolitoglossa hypacra)
Bolitoglossa indio
Bolitoglossa kaqchikelorum
Bolitoglossa la
Oaxacan mushroomtongue salamander (Bolitoglossa macrinii) 
Magnificent web-footed salamander (Bolitoglossa magnifica)
Crater salamander (Bolitoglossa marmorea)
Meliana climbing salamander (Bolitoglossa meliana)
Dwarf climbing salamander (Bolitoglossa minutula)
La Mucuy salamander (Bolitoglossa mucuyensis)
Atoyac salamander (Bolitoglossa oaxacensis)
Todos Santos salamander (Bolitoglossa omniumsanctorum)
Mérida mountain salamander (Bolitoglossa orestes)
Bolitoglossa pacaya
Pandi mushroomtongue salamander (Bolitoglossa pandi)
Pijol salamander (Bolitoglossa porrasorum)
Rilett's climbing salamander (Bolitoglossa riletti)
Cordillera Talamanca salamander (Bolitoglossa sooyorum)
Tamá salamander (Bolitoglossa tamaense)
Bolitoglossa tatamae
Cerro Cituro salamander (Bolitoglossa taylori)
Guatemalan black salamander (Bolitoglossa tenebrosa)
Veracruz salamander (Bolitoglossa veracrucis)
Bolitoglossa xibalba
Yariguíes salamander (Bolitoglossa yariguiensis)
Zapotec salamander (Bolitoglossa zapoteca)
Finca Chiblac salamander (Bradytriton sinus)
Gristle-headed splayfoot salamander (Chiropterotriton chondrostega)
Bigfoot splayfoot salamander (Chiropterotriton magnipes)
Xicotepec salamander (Chiropterotriton melipona)
Miquihuana splayfoot salamander (Chiropterotriton miquihuanus)
Toothy splayfoot salamander (Chiropterotriton multidentatus)
Alvarez del Toro's hidden salamander (Cryptotriton alvarezdeltoroi)
Cortez' hidden salamander (Cryptotriton nasalis)
Georgetown salamander (Eurycea naufragia)
Jollyville Plateau salamander (Eurycea tonkawae)
Berry Cave salamander (Gyrinophilus gulolineatus)
West Virginia spring salamander (Gyrinophilus subterraneus)
Oaxacan false brook salamander (Isthmura boneti)
Giant false brook salamander (Isthmura gigantea)
Southern giant salamander (Isthmura maxima)
Jumping salamander (Ixalotriton niger)
Yoro salamander (Nototriton barbouri)
Nototriton brodiei
Nototriton lignicola
Santa Barbara moss salamander (Nototriton limnospectator)
Nototriton major
Los diamantes worm salamander (Oedipina carablanca)
Fortuna worm salamander (Oedipina fortunensis)
Oedipina gracilis
Cerro Pando worm salamander (Oedipina grandis)
Chimaltenango worm salamander (Oedipina ignea)
Muralla worm salamander (Oedipina kasios)
Narrow-footed worm salamander (Oedipina leptopoda)
Motagua worm salamander (Oedipina motaguae)
Nicaraguan worm lizard (Oedipina nica)
Quarry worm salamander (Oedipina poelzi)
Oedpina salvadorensis
Oedipina stenopodia
Taylor's worm salamander (Oedipina taylori)
Tzutujil worm salamander (Oedipina tzutujilorum)
Red Hills salamander (Phaeognathus hubrichti)
Siskiyou Mountains salamander (Plethodon stormi)
Weller's salamander (Plethodon welleri)
Morelos false brook salamander (Pseudoeurycea altamontana)
Sierra de Malinaltepec salamander (Pseudoeurycea amuzga)
Pseudoeurycea conanti
Firschein's false brook salamander (Pseudoeurycea firscheini)
Sierra Juarez false brook salamander (Pseudoeurycea juarezi)
Veracruz worm salamander (Pseudoeurycea lineola)
Longtail false brook salamander (Pseudoeurycea longicauda)
Veracruz green salamander (Pseudoeurycea lynchi)
Black false brook salamander (Pseudoeurycea melanomolga)
Mustache false brook salamander (Pseudoeurycea mystax)
Black-spotted false brook salamander (Pseudoeurycea nigromaculata)
Sierra de Juárez worm salamander (Pseudoeurycea orchileucos)
San Martin worm salamander (Pseudoeurycea orchimelas)
Muscular salamander (Pseudoeurycea papenfussi)
Orange-tailed agile salamander (Pseudoeurycea ruficauda)
Black-footed salamander (Pseudoeurycea tlilicxitl)
Werler's salamander (Pseudoeurycea werleri)
Supramonte cave salamander (Speleomantes supramontis)
Boreal thorius (Thorius boreas)
MacDougall's pygmy salamander (Thorius macdougalli')
Zoquitlan pygmy salamander (Thorius maxillabrochus)Thorius minydemusCerro San Felipe pigmy salamander (Thorius narisovalis)
Omiltemi minute salamander (Thorius omiltemi)
Veracruz pygmy salamander (Thorius pennatulus)
Pine-dwelling minute salamander (Thorius pinicola)
Heroic minute salamander (Thorius tlaxiacus)
Taylor's pigmy salamander (Thorius troglodytes)}}

Asiatic salamanders

Mole salamanders

Salamandrids

Proteids
Alabama waterdog (Necturus alabamensis'')

Frogs
There are 914 frog species assessed as endangered.

Water frogs

Robber frogs

Robust frogs

Shrub frogs

Cryptic forest frogs

Rain frogs

True toads

Fleshbelly frogs

Glass frogs

Litter frogs

Screeching frogs

Hemiphractids

Poison dart frogs

Mantellids

Ceratobatrachids

Fork-tongued frogs

Narrow-mouthed frogs

True frogs

Puddle frogs

Hylids

African reed frogs

Pyxicephalids

Australian ground frogs

Other frog species

Gymnophiona

See also 
 Lists of IUCN Red List endangered species
 List of least concern amphibians
 List of near threatened amphibians
 List of vulnerable amphibians
 List of critically endangered amphibians
 List of recently extinct amphibians
 List of data deficient amphibians

References 

Amphibians
Endangered amphibians
Endangered amphibians